Drăgănești de Vede is a commune in Teleorman County, Muntenia, Romania. It is composed of three villages: Drăgănești de Vede, Măgura cu Liliac and Văcărești.

References

Communes in Teleorman County
Localities in Muntenia